The UAAP Season 80 basketball tournaments were the University Athletic Association of the Philippines (UAAP) basketball tournaments for the 2017–18 school year. The tournaments are divided into men's, women's and juniors' divisions, for male and female college players and male high school players, respectively. The host school for the seniors' division was Far Eastern University, while Ateneo de Manila University was the sub-host for the juniors' division. The De La Salle Green Archers, NU Lady Bulldogs, and FEU Baby Tamaraws are the defending champions for the men's, women's and juniors respectively.

The senior men’s tournament began on September 9, 2017 and the games for the women's division followed on September 10. The juniors' tournament began on November 11.

Attorney. Rene Saguisag, Jr. who was appointed UAAP's executive director served as commissioner for the third straight season.

Teams
All eight member universities of the UAAP field teams in all three divisions.

Coaches

Coaching changes

Venues
The Mall of Asia Arena, Smart Araneta Coliseum and the Filoil Flying V Centre are the venues for the men's tournament. The venues for the women's tournament are the Mall of Asia Arena, the Smart Araneta Coliseum and the Ateneo Blue Eagle Gym. The Filoil Flying V Centre and the Ateneo Blue Eagle Gym will serve as the venues for the juniors' tournament.

Men's tournament

Elimination round

Team standings

Match-up results

Scores

Bracket
*Game went into overtime.

Semifinals
In the semifinals, the higher seed has the twice-to-beat advantage, where they only have to win once, while their opponents twice, to progress.

Ateneo vs. FEU
The Ateneo Blue Eagles has the twice-to-beat advantage.

La Salle vs. Adamson
The De La Salle Green Archers has the twice-to-beat advantage.

Finals 

 Finals Most Valuable Player:

Awards 

 Most Valuable Player: 
 Rookie of the Year: 
 Mythical Team:

Sponsored awards
 Manulife 110% Heart and Hustle Player of the Season: 
 Shell V-Power Most Efficient Player of the Season: 
 Appeton Most Improved Player of the Season: 
 Milo Nutri-up Up Your Galing Performance Award: 
 PSBankable Player of the Season: 
 Manulife 110% Heart and Hustle Player of the Finals: 
 PSBankable Player of the Finals: 
 BDO Winning Ways Coach of the Season:

Players of the Week

Statistics

Players' statistical points

Source: ABS-CBN Sports

Season player highs

Source: HumbleBola Stats

Game player highs

Source: HumbleBola Stats

Game team highs 

Source: HumbleBola Stats

Season team highs 

Source: HumbleBola Stats

Broadcast notes
ABS-CBN Sports is the official broadcaster of the UAAP Season 80 Men's Basketball games.

UAAP-JBL Three-Point Contest 
The UAAP Three-Point Contest, or the UAAP-JBL Three-Point Contest for sponsorship reasons, is the inaugural three-point competition of the UAAP in the basketball discipline. The contest served as a transition event from the first round going to the second round of eliminations. All eight universities fielded representative shooters to compete for the chance to clinch ₱80,000 and JBL products for the winner, and another ₱50,000 will be given to the winning university. In the end of the competition, the older brother of Adrian Wong, Dan Angelo Wong, claimed the inaugural title for the said competition.

Competition Format 
In the first round, all eight participants will get a chance to shoot as many three-pointers as they can within the time limit of one (1) minute. In each rack, the first four balls were regular balls, which is worth only one point, and the fifth and the last ball is the moneyball, which is worth two points. After the first round, only the top two (2) players would advance the final round, competing for the championship.

Results

Women's tournament 
The NU Lady Bulldogs won their 64th straight match after clinching their four-peat championship against the UE Lady Warriors on December 3, 2017.

NU's Ria Nabalan recorded a triple-double in their second round win over the FEU Lady Tamaraws on October 18, 2017. Nabalan tallied 12 points, 10 rebounds and 10 assists to lead the Lady Bulldogs to their 56th consecutive win that dates back to Season 77.

For the first time in 49 years, the UE Lady Warriors advanced to the Finals after defeating the UST Tigresses in the second round of the Stepladder semifinals to face the undefeated NU Lady Bulldogs. A punch thrown by UST's Sai Larosa at Love Sto. Domingo ignited a bench-clearing brawl among the players of the two teams. Larosa was disqualified from inclusion to the Mythical team following her ejection and subsequent suspension.

The UE Lady Warriors held the Adamson Lady Falcons to a scoreless 2nd quarter in their 62-44 win on October 1, 2017.

Elimination round

Team standings

Match-up results

Scores

Bracket

Stepladder semifinals

First round

Second round
In the semifinals, UE has the twice-to-beat advantage, where they only have to win once, while their opponents twice, to progress.

Finals 
For the fourth straight year, the NU Lady Bulldogs accomplished an elimination round sweep and will battle in a best-of-three Finals. 

 Finals Most Valuable Player:

Awards 

 Most Valuable Player: 
 Rookie of the Year: 
 Mythical Five:

Statistics

Players' statistical points

Source: Tiebreaker Times

Juniors' tournament

Elimination round

Team standings

Match-up results

Scores

Fourth-seed playoff

Bracket

Stepladder semifinals

First round

Second round
NU has the twice-to-beat advantage

Finals

Finals Most Valuable Player: 
The Ateneo Blue Eaglets' 7'1" center Kai Sotto recorded a triple-double in their Game 1 win over the NU Bullpups in their best-of-three Finals series on February 23, 2018. Sotto tallied 22 points, 16 rebounds and 11 blocks. Of those 11 shot-blocks, five were made in the first half.

Awards

 Most Valuable Player: 
 Rookie of the Year: 
 Mythical Five:

Statistics

Players' statistical points

Source: ABS-CBN Sports

Overall Championship points

Seniors' division 

In case of a tie, the team with the higher position in any tournament is ranked higher. If both are still tied, they are listed by alphabetical order.

How rankings are determined:
 Ranks 5th to 8th determined by elimination round standings.
 Loser of the #1 vs #4 semifinal match-up is ranked 4th
 Loser of the #2 vs #3 semifinal match-up is ranked 3rd
 Loser of the finals is ranked 2nd
 Champion is ranked 1st

See also 
 NCAA Season 93 basketball tournaments

References

UAAP Season 80
UAAP basketball tournaments
2017–18 in Philippine college basketball